The Brewton Historic Commercial District is a  historic district in Brewton, Escambia County, Alabama.  It is centered on U.S. Route 31.  During its heyday it was the largest commercial center on the railroad between Montgomery and the Gulf Coast ports of Pensacola and Mobile.  The district was the early commercial area of the town, with the majority of the structures dating to the late 19th and early 20th centuries.  It contained 47 properties.  It was added to the National Register of Historic Places on March 15, 1982.

References

National Register of Historic Places in Escambia County, Alabama
Historic districts in Escambia County, Alabama
Historic districts on the National Register of Historic Places in Alabama